Conus crosnieri is a species of sea snail, a marine gastropod mollusk, in the family Conidae, the cone snails and their allies.

Description
The length of the shell attains 59.6 mm, its diameter 24.8 mm. The maximum length of the dredged species is 83.8 mm.

Distribution
The holotype of this marine species has been found in the Mozambique Channel off the Comores and also off Madagascar and  S KwaZulu-Natal, South Africa.

References

External links
 Manuel J. Tenorio, Eric Monnier & Nicolas Puillandre - Notes on Afonsoconus Tucker & Tenorio, 2013 (Gastropoda, Conidae), with description of a new species from the Southwestern Indian Ocean; European Journal of Taxonomy 472: 1–20, 2018

crosnieri